The following is a timeline of the history of the city of Besançon, France.

Prior to 19th century

 58 BCE - Julius Caesar occupied Vesontio, the chief town of the Sequani.
 175 CE –  (arch) built (approximate date).
 4th C. – Roman Catholic diocese of Besançon active.
 11th C. –  built.
 1184 - Frederick I made it a free imperial city. 
 1393 –  built.
 1487 – Printing press in operation.
 1537 –  adopted.
 1540 –  built by Nicolas Perrenot de Granvelle.
 1668 – Citadel of Besançon construction begins.
 1674 – Siege of Besançon.
 1676 – Parlement of Besançon established.
 1678 – Besançon becomes part of France per Treaty of Nijmegen.
 1694 - Bibliothèque municipale de Besançon (municipal library) founded.
 1749 –  rebuilt.
 1751 - Birth of Marquis de Jouffroy d'Abbans, inventor of steam-navigation.
 1752 –  founded.
 1766 – St. Madeleine Church built.
 1786 –  built.
 1790 – Besançon becomes part of the Doubs souveraineté.
 1793 – Population: 25,328.
 1796 – Departmental archives of Doubs established.

19th century
 1802 – 26 February: Birth of Victor Hugo, writer.
 1814 – Besançon besieged by Austrian forces.
 1818 – Besançon municipal library building opens.
 1819 – Chamber of Commerce established.
 1831 – Fort Beauregard built.
 1833 – Rhone–Rhine Canal opens.
 1843 –  created.
 1850 –  laid out.
 1856 – Railway begins operating.
 1871 – A project of Besançon Commune is engaged.
 1876 – Population: 54,404.
 1883 –  newspaper in publication.
 1888 –  founded.
 1892 –  built.
 1893 –  (theatre) opens.
 1896 – Dépêche Républicaine newspaper begins publication.
 1897 – Besançon tramway begins operating.(fr)
 1899 – Société d'histoire naturelle du Doubs established.
 1900 – Fountain built on the Place Jean-Cornet.(fr)

20th century

 1902 – Victor Hugo statue erected on the Promenade Granvelle.(fr)
 1903 – Eclair Comtois newspaper begins publication.
 1906 - Population: 56,168.
 1910 – January 1910 Doubs river flood.
 1911 – Population: 57,978.
 1945 – Jean Minjoz becomes mayor.
 1948 – Besançon International Music Festival begins.
 1951 – International Besançon Competition for Young Conductors begins.
 1953 –  rebuilt.
 1954 – Population: 73,445.
 1957 – Botanical garden established at Place Leclerc.
 1960 – Planoise redevelopment process begins.
 1964 – Gare de Besançon-Viotte rebuilt.
 1968 – Population: 113,220.
 1970 – Besançon courthouse attack.
 1972
  established.
 Francis of Assisi Church built.
 1975 – Population: 120,315.
 1977 –  becomes mayor.
 1983 – Jean Minjoz Hospital opens.
 1994 –  established.(fr)

21st century

 2001 – Jean-Louis Fousseret becomes mayor.
 2002 –  opens.
 2005 – 3 November: 2005 Planoise Forum fire.
 2010 – 13 December: School hostage crisis.
 2011 – Population: 115,879.
 2014 – 30 August: commissioning of the Besançon tramway.
 2015 – December:  held.
 2016 – Besançon becomes part of the Bourgogne-Franche-Comté region.
 2001 – Anne Vignot becomes mayor.

See also
 Besançon history
 
 Chronology of Planoise, a neighborhood in Besançon
 Other names of Besançon e.g. Bisanz, Vesontio
 
 
  department
  region

other cities in the Bourgogne-Franche-Comté region
 Timeline of Dijon

References

This article incorporates information from the French Wikipedia.

Bibliography

in English

in French

External links

 Items related to Besançon, various dates (via Europeana).
 Items related to Besançon, various dates (via Digital Public Library of America).

besancon
History of Besançon
besancon